The Weasel and Aphrodite, is one of Aesop's Fables, numbered 50 in the Perry Index. A fable on the cynic theme of the constancy of one's nature, it serves as a cautionary tale against trusting those with evil temper, for even if they  might change their body, they will not change their mind.

The story 
A weasel fell in love with a young man, and begged the goddess of love, Aphrodite, to transform her into a human woman. Aphrodite, touched, did so, and turned the weasel into a exceedingly beautiful woman that every man would be lucky to have. The young man fell in love with the weasel, and soon they got married. As the woman sat in the nuptial bedroom, Aphrodite wished to test whether she truly was a human now or still retained an animal's nature at heart, so she released a mouse. Sure enough, the woman leapt out of the bed and caught the mouse to eat it. Aphrodite was angered, for she knew now that the weasel had not changed her ways at all upon becoming a woman. So, she turned her back into a weasel.

To this is related an idiom related by Zenobius, "the wedding dress does not fit the weasel", which directly references the Aesopian fable; compare the modern Greek word for weasel, which literally translates to "little bride."

Other versions 
Shorter is the version recorded by Babrius, who has the woman chase the mouse during the very nuptial feast, thus bringing the wedding to an end. Babrius does not state that Aphrodite released the mouse, instead writing that "[a]fter having played his little joke, Eros took his leave: Nature had proved stronger than Love."

See also 

 Zeus and the Tortoise
 The Honest Woodcutter
 The North Wind and the Sun

Notes

References

Bibliography 
 
 
 

Aesop's Fables
Folklore
Proverbs
La Fontaine's Fables
ATU 200-219
Deeds of Aphrodite
Deeds of Eros
Metamorphoses into humanoids in Greek mythology